Mary, Untier of Knots or Mary, Undoer of Knots is the name of both a Marian devotion and a Baroque painting (German: Wallfahrtsbild or Gnadenbild) which represents that devotion. The painting by Johann Georg Melchior Schmidtner, of around 1700, is in the Catholic pilgrimage church of St. Peter am Perlach, otherwise known as the Perlach church, in Augsburg, Bavaria, Germany. Devotion to the image had been limited to certain countries in Latin America (e.g., Argentina, Brazil) but became known worldwide following the election of Pope Francis.

Painting
The painting, executed in the Baroque style by Johann Georg Melchior Schmidtner (1625-1707), shows the Blessed Virgin Mary standing on the crescent moon (the usual way of depicting Mary under her title of the Immaculate Conception), surrounded by angels and with the Holy Spirit in the form of a dove hovering above her circle of stars as she unties knots from a long ribbon and at the same time rests her foot on the head of a "knotted" snake. The serpent represents the devil, and her treatment of him fulfills the prophecy in Genesis 3:15: "I will put enmities between thee and the woman, and thy seed and her seed: she shall crush thy head, and thou shalt lie in wait for her heel."

Below are shown a human figure being led by an angel. This scene is often interpreted as Tobias and the Archangel Raphael traveling to ask Sara to be his wife.

The concept of Mary untying knots is derived from a work by St. Irenaeus of Lyons, Adversus haereses (Against Heresies). In Book III, Chapter 22, he presents a parallel between Eve and Mary, describing how "the knot of Eve's disobedience was loosed by the obedience of Mary. For what the virgin Eve had bound fast through unbelief, this did the virgin Mary set free through faith."

The two small figures have also been interpreted as a representation of Wolfgang Langenmantel, the grandfather of the benefactor, guided in his distress by a guardian angel to Father Jakob Rem in Ingolstadt.

History

The painting was donated around 1700 by Hieronymus Ambrosius Langenmantel (1641-1718),, a doctor in Canon law and a canon of the Monastery of Saint Peter in Augsburg. Langenmantel was a friend of the Egyptologist, alchemist and esotericist Athanasius Kircher, as well as a member of the Fruchtbringenden Gesellschaft (Society of the Carpophores), which exerted a considerable influence on the nascent German Freemasonry.

The donation is said to be connected with an event in his family.  His grandfather Wolfgang Langenmantel (1586-1637) was on the verge of the separation from his wife Sophia Rentz (1590-1649) and therefore sought help from Jakob Rem, the Jesuit priest in Ingolstadt. Father Rem prayed to the Blessed Virgin Mary and said: "In diesem religiösen Akt erhebe ich das Band der Ehe, löse alle Knoten und glätte es [In this religious act, I raise the bonds of matrimony, to untie all knots and smoothen them]".  Immediately peace was restored between the husband and wife, and the separation did not happen.  In the memory of this event, their grandson commissioned the painting of the "Untier of Knots".

Devotion
The first chapel to be named "Mary, Untier of Knots" was completed in 1989 in Styria, Austria, inspired as a supplication in response to the Chernobyl Nuclear Tragedy. The image of "Mary, Undoer of Knots" is especially venerated in Argentina and Brazil, where churches have been named for her and devotion to her has become widespread and which the Guardian called a "religious craze".

This devotion has become known worldwide since Cardinal Jorge Mario Bergoglio, Archbishop of Buenos Aires, was elected Pope.  

It had been believed that then-Father Bergoglio had seen the painting in person while visiting Augsburg and brought a copy of the painting to Argentina; however, in an interview for the German newsweekly Die Zeit in 2017, Pope Francis stated that he had never been to Augsburg. It was a German nun who sent him a Christmas greeting card with the image, which aroused his interest. Bergoglio sent his seminarians with copies of the image to the slums of Buenos Aires, where the faithful were overwhelmed by the depiction of Mary as a knot and problem solver.  He then commissioned Barbara Klimmeck, an exchange student from Eichstätt, to document the Augsburg original with all the details so that a copy could be made. In Buenos Aires, a copy was painted by the artist Ana de Betta Berti, for the Church of San José del Talar, which has had it since 8 December 1996.  On the 8th of each month, thousands of people make the pilgrimage to this church.

The devotion reached Brazil near the end of the 20th century. According to Regina Novaes, of the Institute of Religious Studies in Rio de Janeiro, Mary, Untier of Knots "attracts people with small problems". Bergoglio had this image of Mary engraved on a chalice he presented to Pope Benedict XVI and another chalice bearing her image, the work of the same silversmith, is to be presented to Pope Francis on behalf of the Argentine people.

Knowing about Pope Francis' special devotion for this image, a new South Korean ambassador in Vatican in 2018, Baek Man Lee, presented him with a Korean painting of Our Lady Undoer of Knots.

The devotion to Mary, the Untier of Knots, can be found at numerous religious sites around the world.

Title in other languages

Mary, Untier of Knots, has different names in other languages:

 English: Mary, Untier of Knots; Mary, Undoer of Knots; Mary who Unties the Knots
 Sinhala: ශු. මරිය තුමිය , ගැටලිහීමේ දේවමාතාවෝ
 German: Maria Knotenlöserin
 Russian: Мария, развязывающая узлы (Mariya, razvyazyvajushchaya uzly)
 French: Marie qui défait les Nœuds
 Italian: Maria che Scioglie i Nodi
 Polish: Maria Rozwiązująca Węzły
 Portuguese: Maria Desatadora dos Nós, Nossa Senhora Desatadora dos Nós
 Spanish: María Desatanudos; María, Desatadora de Nudos; María, la que Desata los Nudos
 Hungarian: A csomókat feloldó Mária
 Croatian: Marija koja razvezuje čvorove
Chinese: 解結聖母瑪利亞 (Pinyin: Jiějié Shèngmǔ Mǎlìyà)
 Filipino: Maria, Tagakalag ng mga Buhol ng Buhay
Ido: Maria Desliganta la Nodi
Arabic: العذراء التي تحل العقد (ʿAḏrāʾ allatī taḥullu l-ʿuqad) 
 Tamil: துன்ப முடிச்சுக்களை அவிழ்க்கும் அன்னை
 Malayalam: കുരുക്കുകളഴിക്കുന്ന മാതാവ് (Kurukkukal azhikunna madhavu)

See also
Marian devotions
Turamichele, fighting the Archangel Michael at the Perlach-Tower
Girdle of Thomas

References

External links
Virgin Mary, Untier of Knots (International Fraternity)
Mary, Undoer of Knots (US and Canada)
The Holy Grail of Pope Francis: Our Lady of Lujan and Undoer of Knots (Blog: Mary Victrix)
If life has become a bit knotted, turn to Mary - Maria Knotenlöserin is a favorite of Pope Francis - (TheCompass, 19 November 2013)
The Blessed Virgin Mary, Untier of Knots - (Thinking Faith, 21 May 2013)
Book of Tobit (Douay-Rheims Bible)
 Official Website of the Church of St. Peter am Perlach
 Mary, Untier of Knots:  Links between Augsburg and Buenos Aires
 Maria Desatadora dos Nós (Brazil)
 Prayer to Nossa Senhora Desatadora dos Nós (Brazil)
 Maria Desatanudos

Titles of Mary
Marian devotions
Paintings of the Virgin Mary
Augsburg
Birds in art
Dogs in art
Angels in art
Paintings depicting Tobias